Colonel Arthur Hay, 9th Marquess of Tweeddale,  (9 November 1824 – 29 December 1878), known before 1862 as Lord Arthur Hay and between 1862 and 1876 as Viscount Walden, was a Scottish soldier and ornithologist.

Life

Lord Arthur Hay was born at Yester House near Gifford, East Lothian, the son of General Sir George Hay, 8th Marquess of Tweeddale and his wife, Lady Susan Montague. He was sent to university in both Leipzig and Geneva.

Training in the military he received a commission in the British Army in 1841. He rose to be a Colonel in the Grenadier Guards. He served as a soldier in India and the Crimea. He succeeded his father in the Marquessate in 1876. 

Hay purchased a lieutenancy in the Grenadier Guards in 1841. He purchased a captaincy in 1846 and was promoted lieutenant-colonel without purchase in 1854 and Colonel in 1860. In 1866 he transferred to the 17th Lancers.

He was president of the Zoological Society of London from 16 January 1868. He had a private collection of birds, insects, reptiles and mammals and employed Carl Bock to travel to Maritime Southeast Asia and collect specimens. Tweeddale described about 40 species collected by Bock for the first time and was elected a Fellow of the Royal Society in 1871.

His ornithological works were published privately in 1881 by his nephew, Captain Robert George Wardlaw-Ramsay, with a memoir by Dr W. H. Russell, and the attribution Walden is used in taxonomic listings.

Lord Tweeddale died at Walden Cottage in Chislehurst, London on 28 December 1878. As he had no issue, he was succeeded as Marquess of Tweeddale by his brother, William.

Family

He married twice: firstly in 1857 to Helene Kilmansegge (d.1871) and secondly in 1873 to Julia Mackenzie of Seaforth, daughter of Lt.-Colonel Keith William Stewart-Mackenzie (9 May 1818 – June 1881) and of Hannah Charlotte Hope Vere. After Hay's death she married secondly Sir John Rose, 1st Baronet; and thirdly after his death William Evans-Gordon, MP. (All without issue).

References

1824 births
1878 deaths
People from East Lothian
9
Grenadier Guards officers
17th Lancers officers
Scottish soldiers
British Army personnel of the Crimean War
Scottish ornithologists
Hay, Arthur
Hay, Arthur
Hay, Arthur
Hay, Arthur